Tartrazine is a synthetic lemon yellow azo dye primarily used as a food coloring.  It is also known as E number E102, C.I. 19140, FD&C Yellow 5, Yellow 5 Lake, Acid Yellow 23, Food Yellow 4, and trisodium 1-(4-sulfonatophenyl)-4-(4-sulfonatophenylazo)-5-pyrazolone-3-carboxylate).

Tartrazine is a commonly used color all over the world, mainly for yellow, and can also be used with brilliant blue FCF (FD&C Blue 1,  E133) or green S (E142) to produce various green shades.

Products containing tartrazine

Foods 

Many foods contain tartrazine in varying proportions, depending on the manufacturer or person preparing the food.  When in food, tartrazine is typically labelled as "color", "tartrazine", or "E102", depending on the jurisdiction, and the applicable labeling laws (see Regulation below).

Products containing tartrazine commonly include processed commercial foods that have an artificial yellow or green color, or that consumers expect to be brown or creamy looking. It has been frequently used in the bright yellow coloring of imitation lemon filling in baked goods. The following is a list of foods that may contain tartrazine:

 Desserts and confectionery: ice cream, ice pops and popsicles, confectionery and hard candy (such as gummy bears, Peeps marshmallow treats, etc.), cotton candy, instant puddings and gelatin (such as Jell-O), cake mixes, pastries (such as Pillsbury pastries), custard powder, marzipan, biscuits, and cookies.
 Beverages: soft drinks (such as Mountain Dew), energy and sports drinks, powdered drink mixes (such as Kool-Aid), fruit cordials, and flavored/mixed alcoholic beverages.
 Snacks: flavored corn chips (such as Doritos, nachos, etc.), chewing gum, popcorn (both microwave and cinema-popped), and potato chips.
 Condiments and spreads: jam, jelly (including mint jelly), marmalade, mustard, horseradish, pickles (and other products containing pickles such as tartar sauce and dill pickle dip), and processed sauces.
 Other processed foods: cereal (such as corn flakes, muesli, etc.), instant or "cube" soups,  rices (like paella, risotto, etc.), noodles (such as some varieties of Kraft Dinner), pureed fruit and pickled peppers, bright-green-colored seaweed salad.

Personal care and cosmetics products 
A number of personal care and cosmetics products may contain tartrazine, usually labelled as CI 19140 or FD&C Yellow 5, including:

 Liquid and bar soaps, green hand sanitizer, moisturizers and lotions, mouth washes, perfumes, toothpastes, and shampoos, conditioners and other hair products.
 Cosmetics, such as eyeshadow, blush, face powder and foundation, lipstick, etc. – even those that are primarily pink or purple.  (Usually make-up manufacturers use one label for all shades in a product line, placing the phrase "may contain" ahead of all colors that are used in that line, not necessarily that specific shade.)
 Nail polish, nail polish remover, temporary tattoos, and tanning lotions.

Medications 
Various types of medications include tartrazine to give a yellow, orange or green hue to a liquid, capsule, pill, lotion, or gel, primarily for easy identification.  Types of pharmaceutical products that may contain tartrazine include vitamins, antacids, cold medications (including cough drops and throat lozenges), lotions and prescription drugs.

Most, if not all, medication data sheets are required to contain a list of all ingredients, including tartrazine.  Some include tartrazine in the allergens alert section.

The Canadian Compendium of Pharmaceuticals and Specialties (CPS), a prescribing reference book for health professionals, mentions tartrazine as a potential allergy for each drug that contains tartrazine.

Other products 
Other products, such as household cleaning products, paper plates, pet foods, crayons, inks for writing instruments, stamp dyes, face paints, envelope glues, and deodorants, may also contain tartrazine.

Chemistry
Tartrazine is water-soluble and has a maximum absorbance in an aqueous solution at 425 nm.  It is one of the oldest known member of the pyrazolone family of dyes.

Potential health effects on humans

Sensitivity
Tartrazine appears to cause the most allergic and intolerance reactions of all the azo dyes, particularly among asthmatics and those with an aspirin intolerance. Symptoms from tartrazine sensitivity can occur by either ingestion or cutaneous exposure to a substance containing tartrazine. Symptoms appear after periods of time ranging from minutes up to 14 hours.

The prevalence of tartrazine intolerance is estimated at 360,000 U.S. Citizens affected, less than 0.12% of the general population. According to the FDA, tartrazine causes hives in fewer than 1 in 10,000 people, or 0.01%.

It is not clear how many individuals are sensitive or intolerant to tartrazine, but the University of Guelph estimates that it is 1 to 10 out of every ten thousand people (0.01% to 0.1% of the population). There is much controversy about whether tartrazine has ill effects on individuals who are not clearly intolerant.

Total avoidance is the most common way to deal with tartrazine sensitivity, but progress has been made in reducing people's tartrazine sensitivity in a study of people who are simultaneously sensitive to both aspirin and tartrazine.

Asthma 

A systematic review of the medical literature concluded that among patients with asthma, research has shown that exposure to tartrazine does not worsen symptoms and avoidance of tartrazine does not improve symptoms; however, "due to the paucity of evidence, it is not possible to provide firm conclusions as to the effects of tartrazine on asthma control".

Food intolerance and ADHD-like behavior
Although tartrazine is one of various food colors said to cause food intolerance and ADHD-like behavior in children, evidence for this claim is lacking.  It is possible that certain food colorings may act as a trigger in those who are genetically predisposed, but the evidence for this effect is weak.

Cancer
A 2015 study found that Yellow 5 caused damage to white blood cells, which may make the development of tumors and diseases such as cancer more likely.

Some studies suggested that tartrazine can cause kidney tumours in laboratory animals.

Myths
Rumors began circulating about tartrazine in the 1990s regarding a link to its consumption (specifically its use in Mountain Dew) and adverse effects on male potency, testicle and penis size, and sperm count. There are no documented cases supporting the claim tartrazine will shrink a penis or cause it to stop growing.

Regulation

North America

Canada 

Tartrazine is listed as a permitted food coloring in Canada.  The majority of pre-packaged foods are required to list all ingredients, including all food additives such as color; however section B.01.010 (3)(b) of the Regulations provide food manufacturers with the choice of declaring added color(s) by either their common name or simply as "colour".

In February 2010, Health Canada consulted the public and manufacturers on their plans to change the labelling requirements.  Health Canada felt that it might be prudent to require the identification of specific colors on food labels, to allow consumers to make better informed choices. The results of the consultation supported increased transparency. Some respondents proposed banning the use of synthetic food colors, however Health Canada found that existing scientific literature does not demonstrate that synthetic food coloring is unsafe in the general population; they are instead considering more transparent labelling to allow those with sensitivities to food color to make informed choices. The relevant proposed regulatory changes will be developed and published for consultation in Part I of the Canada Gazette, the official newsletter of the Government of Canada.

United States 
The United States requires the presence of tartrazine to be declared on food and drug products (21 CFR 74.1705 (revised April 2013), 21 CFR 201.20) and also color batches to be preapproved by the United States Food and Drug Administration (FDA). As part of these regulations, the FDA requires that the Precautions section of prescription drug labels include the warning statement, "This product contains FD&C Yellow No. 5 (tartrazine) which may cause allergic-type reactions (including bronchial asthma) in certain susceptible persons. Although the overall incidence of FD&C Yellow No. 5 (tartrazine) sensitivity in the general population is low, it is frequently seen in patients who also have aspirin hypersensitivity."

The FDA regularly seizes products if found to be containing undeclared tartrazine, declared but not FDA-tested, or labeled something other than FD&C yellow 5 or Yellow 5. Such products seized often include noodles.

Europe

European Union 
The European Food Safety Authority allows for tartrazine to be used in processed cheese, canned or bottled fruit or vegetables, processed fish or fishery products, and wines and wine-based drinks.

The European regulatory community, with a stronger emphasis on the precautionary principle, required labelling and temporarily reduced the acceptable daily intake (ADI) for the food colorings; the UK FSA called for voluntary withdrawal of the colorings by food manufacturers.  However, in 2009 the EFSA re-evaluated the data at hand and determined that "the available scientific evidence does not substantiate a link between the color additives and behavioral effects."

Tartrazine is among six artificial colors for which the European Union requires products that contain them to be marked with the statement May have an adverse effect on activity and attention in children.

Austria 
Yellow tartrazine (E102) is banned in Austria.

Norway 
Yellow tartrazine (E102) is banned in Norway (not an E.U. member.)

United Kingdom 
In response to concerns about the safety of certain food additives, the UK FSA  commissioned a study by researchers at Southampton University of the effect of a mixture of six food dyes (Tartrazine, Allura Red, Ponceau 4R, Quinoline Yellow WS, Sunset Yellow and Carmoisine (dubbed the "Southampton 6")) and sodium benzoate (a preservative) on children in the general population, who consumed them in beverages; the study published in 2007.  The study found "a possible link between the consumption of these artificial colours and a sodium benzoate preservative and increased hyperactivity" in the children; the advisory committee to the FSA that evaluated the study also determined that because of study limitations, the results could not be extrapolated to the general population, and further testing was recommended.

Other uses

3D printing
Tartrazine has been used as a biocompatible photoblocker for generating transparent hydrogels with complex inner structures.

See also

 Sunset yellow FCF, also known as Yellow 6.

References

External links 
 Color Additives Information (Food and Drug Administration)
 Petition to the FDA to delist Yellow #5 (Food and Drug Administration)
  
 Some more details, other common names
 Reuters report on EU discussion of Food Additives ban

Azo dyes
Food colorings
Organic sodium salts
Benzenesulfonates
Pyrazoles
Salts of carboxylic acids
E-number additives
Acid dyes